Karl May is a 1974 West German biographical drama film directed by Hans-Jürgen Syberberg, starring Helmut Käutner as the writer Karl May. It is considered the second part in Syberberg's "German trilogy", preceded by Ludwig: Requiem for a Virgin King from 1972 and succeeded by Hitler: A Film from Germany from 1977.

It was shot at the Bavaria Studios in Munich with sets designed by Nino Borghi. Location shooting took place in Vienna from 4 April to 17 May 1974. The budget was 1.1 million Deutsche Mark, of which the broadcaster ZDF provided 700,000 Mark.

Partial cast

References

Bibliography

External links 
 

1974 films
1970s biographical films
German biographical films
Biographical films about writers
Films directed by Hans-Jürgen Syberberg
Films shot in Vienna
1970s German-language films
West German films
Films set in the 1900s
Films set in the 1910s
Karl May
German historical films
1970s historical films
Films shot at Bavaria Studios
1970s German films